Warrant Officer Dezső Szentgyörgyi (16 January 1915 – 28 August 1971) was the highest scoring Hungarian fighter ace of the Royal Hungarian Honvéd Air Force in World War II.

Early life/Royal Hungarian Honvéd Air Force
Dezső Szentgyörgyi was born in 1915 in Kőkút. He finished his studies in Enying, and was 18 years old when he volunteered for the Royal Hungarian Air Force. Initially he was an aircraft-mechanic, but later received pilot training. He finished the aviation school in Székesfehérvár with excellent ratings. He was trained as a fighter pilot, and took part in 1/2 FS's operations in northern Hungary with the Fiat CR.32. In summer 1942 he was transferred with the 1/1 "Dongó" (Bumblebee) Fighter Squadron to the Soviet front. He flew the Reggiane Re.2000 Falco (MÁVAG Héja), then the Messerschmitt Bf 109G. 
He shot down his first aircraft on 7 August 1942 in a friendly fire accident, while flying a Re.2000. The victim being a German Heinkel He 111 bomber that opened fire on him during while Szentgyörgyi was trying to identify the aircraft. His first victory over an enemy fighter was almost a year later, 26 June 1943, a Soviet fighter, a Yak-1 or Yak-7 , on Gresnoje. 
His record on the Eastern Front was 142 sorties and 6 kills.

In the Puma Group
The 101. Honi Légvédelmi Vadászrepülő Osztály (101st "Puma" Fighter Group) was formed on 1 May 1944. Szentgyörgyi was transferred to the 101/2 "Retek" (Radish) Fighter Squadron. He continued to score his kills among the Pumas, and shot down 6 American planes. By the summer of 1944 he was a flight leader. He was promoted to Ensign on 16 November 1944. After the "American Season" ended, once again Soviet fighters became the main enemy. Dezső scored an additional 17 kills.
He achieved his last air victory on 16 April 1945: a Yak-9 on Guttenbrunn.   
He never crashed a plane due to pilot error, and he was never shot down. By the end of the war he had completed more than 220 sorties, and had 30 confirmed kills; the most successful Hungarian fighter pilot.

After the war
After the war, he returned home and became a pilot of the MASZOVLET (Hungarian-Soviet Airlines) between 1946 and 1949. Between 1950 and 1956 he spent several years in Communist prisons, before becoming a pilot of the renamed Malév Hungarian Airlines again, logging 12,334 flight hours and covering more than 5 million kilometres in the air.

Death
On 28 August 1971 Szentgyörgyi was the pilot of MALEV Hungarian Airlines Flight 731, and was among the 32 people killed when the Ilyushin Il-18 crashed into the sea during a storm on its approach to a landing in Copenhagen in Denmark.  Szentgyörgyi and the other eight members of his crew died, and only two of the 25 passengers survived. died in a crash near Copenhagen while flying an Ilyushin Il-18 (HA-MOC). He was due to retire in less than three weeks.

The MH 59th "Szentgyörgyi Dezső" Air Base of the Hungarian Air Force in Kecskemét (equipped with MiG-29 and JAS 39 Gripen fighters) is named in his honour.

Victories

References
Notes

Bibliography

 Becze Csaba – Elfelejtett Hősök – A Magyar Királyi Honvéd Légierő ászai a II. világháborúban, Puedlo Kiadó, 2006, 
 Becze Csaba – Elfelejtett Hősök – A Magyar Királyi Honvéd Légierő ászai a II. világháborúban, Zrinyi Kiadó, 2016, second, extended edition 
 Császár Ottó – Élet és Halál a Levegőben – vitéz Szentgyörgyi Dezső életrajzi regénye, Malév Kiadó, 1994, 
 Pataki I./Rozsos L./Sárhidai Gy. – Légi Háború Magyarország Felett I., Zrínyi Kiadó, 1992, 
 Pataki I./Rozsos L./Sárhidai Gy. – Légi Háború Magyarország Felett II., Zrínyi Kiadó, 1993, 
 Punka György – Hungarian Aces of World War 2, Osprey Publishing, Oxford, England, 2002.
 Punka György – A "Messzer" – Bf 109-ek a Magyar Királyi Honvéd Légierőben, OMIKK, 1995, 
 Punka Gy./Sárhidai Gy. – Magyar Sasok – A Magyar Királyi Honvéd Légierő 1920 – 1945, K.u.K. Kiadó, 2006, 
 Tobak Tibor – Pumák Földön-Égen, Lap és Könyvkiadó Kft., 1989,

External links
  Second World War uniforms of the Royal Hungarian Honvéd Air Force

1915 births
1971 deaths
Aviators killed in aviation accidents or incidents
Hungarian World War II flying aces
Victims of aviation accidents or incidents in Denmark
Victims of aviation accidents or incidents in 1971